Askar kalibari Secondary School & College is a combined school located in Askar, Agailjhara, Barisal, Bangladesh. It is one of the oldest and top ranked high schools in Agailjhara  and the first high school in  Baghdaha Union. It is semi govt school and college located at School Road, Askar near Askar Puran Kalibari. The school has a long history. It was founded by Mahatma Rai Charan Bairagi with some educationist of Askar, on 1 January 1943 with very few student. Now it has more than 600 students. The school offers grades from class VI to class X and college offers XI to XII. It has only one day shift class. The school starts at 10:00 am and end at 4:00 pm.

History
Mahatma Rai Charan Bairagee established the school with some educationist of the village. It has a long historical background.

Faculty

There are 14 faculty members in the institution.

Education system
The school run by national curriculum of Bangladesh Government under the Barisal Board.
The student of the school attend s's exam from:
1. Science Group
2. Business Studies Group
3. Art's Group

HSC Exam
1. ARTS GROUP

Academic building
The school has two beautiful academic building and 20 classroom. A big open auditorium established in 1996. Both building are two stored.

School hostel
The school hostel was established by former headmaster Nijamul Islam in 2006 due to request of some SSC candidate of the school. It is situated east side 2nd academic building. In this time hostel in charge was librarian Haroshit Halder.

Playground
There is a big playground in front of 1st academic building. This playground mainly use for playing cricket and football. In winter season some student play badminton in the ground. 
There is a big pond east side of the field.

Celebration
From the beginning of establishment of the school there is many kind of celebration national and international.
Student and teacher celebrate those program
21 February (International Mother language Day)
16 December (Victory Day of Bangladesh)
Saraswti puja
Annual sports and culture program
Guardian day

Awards
1. SEQAEP Award by Ministry of Education for Outstanding result in SSC exam in 2012

2. Best school award by D.G office in 2012.

References

1943 establishments in India
Education in Barisal
Education in Bangladesh
Schools in Barisal District
High schools in Bangladesh